IWXXM (ICAO Meteorological Information Exchange Model) is a format for reporting weather information in XML/GML. IWXXM includes XML/GML-based representations for products standardized in International Civil Aviation Organization (ICAO) Annex III and World Meteorological Organization (WMO) No. 49, Vol II, such as METAR/SPECI, TAF, SIGMET, AIRMET, Tropical Cyclone Advisory, Volcanic Ash Advisory and Space Weather Advisory.  IWXXM products are used for operational exchanges of meteorological information for use in aviation.

Unlike the traditional forms of the ICAO Annex III / WMO No. 49 products, IWXXM is not intended to be directly used by pilots.  IWXXM is designed to be consumed by software acting on behalf of pilots, such as display software.

History
IWXXM Version 1 was introduced in October 2013, representing METAR, SPECI, TAF and SIGMET formats as specified in International Civil Aviation Organization (ICAO) Annex III, Amendment 76. IWXXM became an optional format for the bilateral exchange of weather reports in November 2013 when the amendment became applicable.  The seventeenth WMO Congress approved IWXXM 1.1, a WMO standard data representation to be included in the new Volume I.3 of WMO-No. 306, Manual on Codes.

IWXXM Version 2 was issued in August 2016 with the introduction of new products including AIRMET, Tropical Cyclone Advisory and Volcanic Ash Advisory, loads of improvements and bug fixes.  Supported by the sixteenth session of the WMO Commission for Basic System in 2016, a slightly revised version IWXXM 2.1 has been approved by the sixty-ninth WMO Executive Council in May 2017.  A patch (IWXXM Version 2.1.1) had been released and approved in Nov 2017 to fix minor issues on validation and examples.

IWXXM Version 3 was first made available as version 3.0RC1 in July 2018.  Major changes include restructuring and simplifying with the removal of Observations and Measurements model (O&M), addition of the new Space Weather Advisory and other changes with regard to Amendment 78 to ICAO Annex 3, and numerous fixes and enhancements.  IWXXM 3.0RC2 was released in October 2018 for further comments.  Another release candidate IWXXM 3.0RC3 was released in April 2019.  Approval was received in October 2019 and IWXXM 3.0RC4 was released before publishing of the finalized version on 7 November 2019.

IWXXM Version 2021-2 was published in Nov 2021 meeting new requirements in Amendments 79 and 80 to ICAO Annex 3, including the introduction of the new WAFS Significant Weather Forecast to be provided by WAFCs by 2023.

Regulation
IWXXM is regulated by WMO in association with ICAO. IWXXM is defined at the technical regulation level in WMO No.306 Volume I.3 to meet the regulatory requirements described in WMO Technical Regulation No. 49 Vol II or ICAO Annex III.  Another document ICAO Doc 10003 is also available to provide a high level description of the model.

Development
The WMO Commission for Observation, Infrastructures and Information Systems (INFCOM) Task Team on Aviation Data or TT-AvData (previously Commission for Basic System (CBS) Task Team on Aviation XML or TT-AvXML) and ICAO Meteorological Panel (METP) Working Group on Meteorological Information Exchange (WG-MIE) are involved in the development of IWXXM.  The e-mail group tt-avdata@groups.wmo.int was created (Subscription required.  Visit https://groups.wmo.int/ for details) to collect feedback from users.  A GitHub repository https://github.com/wmo-im/iwxxm has been created to engage community participation.

Relationship with WXXM
WXXM is governed by FAA and EUROCONTROL for international products outside of those represented by ICAO or WMO.  WXXM 1.0 was released in 2007.  There were no new releases since the publication of WXXM 3.0.0 in 2019.

See also
 METAR/SPECI
 TAF
 SIGMET
 AIRMET
 Tropical Cyclone Advisory
 Volcanic Ash Advisory
 Space Weather Advisory
 WAFS Significant Weather Forecast

References

External links 
WMO IWXXM Schema Repository
WMO Web-Accessible Codes Registry

Aviation meteorology
Weather forecasting
Meteorological data and networks
XML-based standards